Clunio marinus is a non-biting midge of the bloodworm family (Chironomidae). It is found in the intertidal zone of the European Atlantic Coast from Spain to Iceland. The species is a long-standing model system in chronobiology, particularly for circalunar clocks and the evolution of biological clocks. Its genome has been sequenced.

References

External links
 ClunioBase

Chironomidae
Taxa named by Alexander Henry Haliday
Insects described in 1855